This is a timeline documenting the events of heavy metal in the year 2022.

Bands formed
 Angus McSix
 Elegant Weapons
 Ibaraki

Bands disbanded
 Battlecross (hiatus)
 Blessthefall
 Every Time I Die
 Mary's Blood (hiatus)
 Necronomidol (hiatus)
 Nuclear Assault
 Okilly Dokilly
 The Sword
 Tristania
 Twelve Foot Ninja (indefinite hiatus)

Bands reformed
 A Skylit Drive
 Becoming the Archetype
 Biohazard
 Botch
 Coal Chamber
 Divine Heresy
 Gates of Ishtar
 God Forbid
 Northern Kings
 Pantera
 Prayer for Cleansing (one-off show)
 Watchtower
 Woe, Is Me
 Zero Hour

Deaths
 January 4 – Andrzej Nowak, guitarist of TSA, died from a long-term illness at the age of 62.
 January 10 – Burke Shelley, vocalist and bassist of Budgie, died from undisclosed reasons at the age of 71.
 January 10 – Gérard Drouot, promoter of numerous rock and metal bands including Deep Purple and Alice Cooper, died from leukemia at the age of 69.
 January 20 – Michael Lee Aday, singer and actor better known as Meat Loaf, died from COVID-19 complications at the age of 74.
 January 25 – Fredrik Johansson, former guitarist of Dark Tranquillity, died from cancer at the age of 47.
 January 26 – Kit Woolven, producer and engineer for albums by numerous rock and metal bands including Thin Lizzy, UFO, Cradle of Filth, Tony Iommi, Cathedral, and Steelheart, died from undisclosed reasons at the age of 71.
 February 1 – Jon Zazula, co-founder of Megaforce Records, died from complications of chronic inflammatory demyelinating polyneuropathy, chronic obstructive pulmonary disease, and osteopenia at the age of 69.
 February 6 – Bruce Greig, former guitarist of Misery Index and Dying Fetus, died from undisclosed reasons at the age of 54.
 February 10 – Roman Kostrzewski, vocalist of Kat & Roman Kostrzewski and former vocalist of Kat, died from cancer at the age of 61.
 March 8 – Joe Moore, former drummer of Blood Feast, died from undisclosed reason at the age of 55.
 March 22 – Jayson Holmes, former vocalist and guitarist of Eso-Charis and former vocalist of The Handshake Murders, died from undisclosed reasons at the age of 42.
 March 24 – Didier Séverin, former vocalist of Knut, died from undisclosed reasons.
 March 25 – Taylor Hawkins, former session drummer of Coheed and Cambria, died from undisclosed reasons at the age of 50.
 April 5 – Adam Whited, former bassist of King Conquer, died from undisclosed reasons.
 April 12 – Ronnie Deo, former bassist of Incantation, died from undisclosed reasons.
 April 26 – Randy Rand, bassist of Autograph, died from undisclosed reasons.
 April 30 – Gabe Serbian, drummer of The Locust and Head Wound City, former drummer and guitarist of Cattle Decapitation and former vocalist of Dead Cross, died from undisclosed reasons at the age of 44.
 May 1 – Ric Parnell (also known as Mick Shrimpton), former drummer of Spinal Tap, died from undisclosed reasons at the age of 70.
 May 4 – Howie Pyro, former bassist of Danzig, died from complications due to COVID-related pneumonia at the age of 61.
 May 11 – Trevor Strnad, vocalist of The Black Dahlia Murder, died from undisclosed reasons at the age of 41.
 May 24 – Guillaume Bideau, former vocalist of Mnemic and Scarve, died from undisclosed reasons at the age of 44.
 May 30 – Henrik "Hempo" Hildén, former drummer of John Norum, Don Dokken and Glenn Hughes, died from undisclosed reasons at the age of 69.
 June 3 – Lohy Fabiano, vocalist and bassist of Rebaelliun, died from cardio-respiratory arrest at the age of 44.
 June 5 – Alec John Such, former bassist of Bon Jovi, died from undisclosed reasons at the age of 70.
 June 19 – Brett Tuggle, former keyboardist of David Lee Roth, died from cancer at the age of 70.
 July 1 – Andrew LaBarre, former vocalist and guitarist of Impaled and Ghoul, died from ALS at the age of 43.
 July 5 – Manny Charlton, founding member and former guitarist of Nazareth, died from undisclosed reasons at the age of 80.
 July 24 – Bob Heathcote, former bassist of Suicidal Tendencies, died from injuries sustained in a motorcycle accident at the age of 58.
 July 27 – Kaleb Luebchow, drummer of War of Ages, died from undisclosed reasons.
 July 29 – Michael Bloodgood, bassist of Bloodgood, died from a hemorrhagic stroke.
 August 3 – Nicky Moore, former vocalist of Samson, died from Parkinson's disease at the age of 75.
 August 15 – Steve Grimmett, vocalist of Grim Reaper, died from undisclosed reasons at the age of 62.
 August 19 – Ted Kirkpatrick, drummer of Tourniquet, died from idiopathic pulmonary fibrosis at the age of 62.
 August 22 – Stuart Anstis, former guitarist of Cradle of Filth, died from undisclosed reasons at the age of 48.
 September 7 – Dave Sherman, vocalist of Earthride and former bassist of Spirit Caravan and The Obsessed, died from undisclosed reasons at the age of 55.
 September 14 – David Andersson, guitarist of Soilwork, died from undisclosed reasons at the age of 47.
 October 24 – Paul Stoddard, vocalist of Diecast, died from undisclosed reasons.
 November 6 – Daniel Fawcett, former guitarist of Helix, died from undisclosed reasons at the age of 52.
 November 8 – Dan McCafferty, former vocalist of Nazareth, died from undisclosed reasons at the age of 76.
 November 28 – Mike Clement, guitar tech for Tony Iommi and Motörhead, died from undisclosed reasons.
 December 8 – Stian "Ben Hellion" Andreassen, former guitarist of Nocturnal Breed, died by suicide.
 December 30 – Bob Nalbandian, heavy metal journalist, historian, documentarian, and editor who contributed to hard rock and heavy metal magazines Creem, Music Connection, Hit Parader and BAM, died from mantle cell lymphoma.

Events
 After two postponements, in 2020 and 2021, due to the COVID-19 pandemic, heavy metal-related festivals such as Download, Wacken Open Air, Sweden Rock Festival and Hellfest returned this year.
 On January 10, Judas Priest announced the removal of Andy Sneap as a live member and that the band would continue as a four-piece. The decision was reversed less than a week later after fan backlash.
 On January 21, Testament announced the band was amicably parting ways with longtime drummer Gene Hoglan for the second time. Hoglan's previous stint with the band was between 1996 and 1997. About two months later, he was replaced by Dave Lombardo, who was previously a member of Testament between 1998 and 1999.
 On February 23, Tom Smith, guitarist of The Acacia Strain, announced that he will be leaving the band in early March following a run of shows ending in Albany, New York.
 On March 1, vocalist John Robert Centorrino, bassist Mike Menocker, and drummer Steven Sanchez departed The Last Ten Seconds of Life.
 On March 23, Skid Row announced the departure of lead singer ZP Theart, and that he was being replaced by former H.E.A.T vocalist Erik Grönwall.
 On May 3, Draconian announced the departure of singer Heike Langhans and the return of Lisa Johansson on vocals, as well as the addition of Niklas Nord on guitars.
 On May 4, Cradle of Filth announced the departures of guitarist Rich Shaw and keyboardist Anabelle Iratni.
 On May 6, Amen, co-founder and longtime guitarist of Lordi, announced his departure from the band.
 On May 16, longtime bassist and clean vocalist Josh Gilbert announced his departure from As I Lay Dying. Nearly a week later, on May 22, it was announced that Josh would be filling in, in place of Bill Crook, who had just left Spiritbox, for their 2022 shows. A month later, As I Lay Dying announced they had split with co-founder and longtime drummer Jordan Mancino.
 In July, it was announced Phil Anselmo and Rex Brown would be reuniting Pantera and headlining a number of major festivals across North America and Europe starting later in the year in December. Filling in for the late Dimebag Darrell and Vinnie Paul are Zakk Wylde and Charlie Benante, respectively.
 In July, longtime Deep Purple guitarist Steve Morse announced his departure from the band due to family reasons. Later in September, touring guitarist Simon McBride (formerly of Sweet Savage) was announced as a permanent member.
 On August 21, Nightwish announced the addition of bassist Jukka Koskinen as an official member. Koskinen was previously the band's session member for the Human. :II: Nature. World Tour, after the departure of longtime bassist Marko Hietala in January 2021.
 In August, Neurosis guitarist and founding member Scott Kelly announced his retirement from music, admitting in a social media post that he has "engaged in the emotional, financial, verbal and physical abuse" of his wife and children. The band responded with a statement that they stopped working with Scott in 2019 after learning about his behavior, but not sharing the information out of respect for his wife's request for privacy.
 On October 26, Mötley Crüe co-founder and lead guitarist Mick Mars announced his retirement from touring with the band due to ongoing health problems. The band subsequently announced John 5 (formerly of Marilyn Manson and Rob Zombie) as the live guitarist.
 On November 5, Judas Priest were inducted into the Rock and Roll Hall of Fame, playing a 3 song set alongside former members K. K. Downing and Les Binks.

Albums released

January

February

March

April

May

June

July

August

September

October

November

December

References

Heavy Metal
2020s in heavy metal music